Parnell Park is a GAA stadium in Donnycarney, Dublin, Ireland with a capacity of 8,500. It is the  home of the Dublin GAA hurling, football, camogie and ladies' football teams at all levels of competition.

The ground is used by Dublin's inter-county teams mainly during home National Hurling League & All-Ireland Senior Hurling Championship games and as a training ground, with most National Football League and All-Ireland Senior Football Championship games played in Croke Park. However, Dublin county championships and other competitions also take place in Parnell Park every year.

Parnell Park also serves as the headquarters of the Dublin County Board.

Design
Parnell Park follows the standard four-sided design of most stadiums. The ground has a main stand on the north side of the pitch which can seat about 2,800. The main stand is covered and has one tier. The stand includes facilities and shops under the stand.

The rest of the ground is terraced with the majority of it covered, although some of the main terrace on the south side is not covered. The terrace on the west side of the ground is known as the Church end due to it being near Donnycarney Church. The terraces in Parnell are all one tier and the facilities and shops are at the rear or the side depending on which terrace you are in.

In 2004 late work began to install flood lights in Parnell Park. The first competitive match under lights was played in 2005 and saw Dublin defeat Mayo 2-13 to 1-15.

See also
 List of Gaelic Athletic Association stadiums
 List of stadiums in Ireland by capacity

References

External links
 https://www.squareball.com/club-county/pitch-finder/dublin-county/parnell-park/

Dublin GAA
Gaelic games grounds in the Republic of Ireland
Sports venues in Dublin (city)